Pop Up is the debut studio album by French electropop band Yelle. It was released on 3 September 2007 by the EMI-owned label Source Etc. The album peaked at number 61 in France, where it was certified silver by the Syndicat National de l'Édition Phonographique (SNEP). As of June 2008, the album had sold 45,000 copies in France and 11,000 copies in the United States.

Promotion
On 26 February 2008, Yelle performed the track "A cause des garçons" on the BBC Three talk show Lily Allen and Friends. They were featured as MTV's Artist of the Week for the week of 24–30 March 2008, appearing during adverts. The group also appeared twice on NBC's Last Call with Carson Daly, performing "A cause des garçons" on 12 November 2008 and "Ce jeu" on 4 February 2009.

The Riot in Belgium remix of Yelle's single "A cause des garçons" was featured on the soundtrack of the 2007 Electronic Arts video game Need for Speed: ProStreet. EA Sports also included the remix in UEFA Euro 2008, the official video game of the UEFA Euro 2008 tournament.

"A cause des garçons" was used as the opening song for the Moschino spring/summer 2008 runway show. In 2008, it was also featured in an advert being broadcast in Quebec for Telus. Their single "Je veux te voir" was featured on the season four finale of HBO's Entourage on 2 September 2007, in the opening scene when the gang arrives in Cannes. "A cause des garçons" was also used in one of the Les Jeunes de Paris sketches on the 12 November 2011 episode of Saturday Night Live, hosted by Emma Stone.

Track listing

Sample credits
 "Ce jeu" contains a sample from "Let Me Go" as performed by Heaven 17.
 "Tu es beau" contains a sample from "Do You Really Want an Answer?" as performed by Zapp.

Personnel
Credits adapted from the liner notes of Pop Up.

 GrandMarnier – production, recording, mixing, design
 Olivier de Brood – recording, mixing
 Chris Gehringer – mastering
 Pierre Le Ny – art direction
 Grégoire Alexandre – photography
 Jr. Henry – design

Charts

Certifications

|}

Release history

References

2007 debut albums
Astralwerks albums
Caroline Records albums
EMI Records albums
Yelle albums